The surname Ames is usually either French, English or German in origin. The French name comes from the noun , meaning a friend or a beloved.  The surname also derives from the Old French and Middle English personal name Amys or Amice, the Latin amicus, or from a Late Latin derivative of this, Amicius.  The German roots of the name could have come from the Old High German word , meaning "busy," as a nickname for an active person.  The name also has connections to the modern German name Ameise, meaning "ant".

Variations of the surname include Aames, Amess, Amies, Amis, Amiss, Amos, Hames, Haymes, Eames, and others.  The name may also be a contraction of Ambrose.

The Ames family is an old and notable family in the United States.

People with the surname
A. A. Ames (Albert Alonzo Ames, 1842–1911), American physician and politician
Adelaide Ames (1900–1932), American astronomer, co-author of the Shapley-Ames Catalog
Adelbert Ames (1835–1933), American Civil War general
Adelbert Ames Jr. (1880–1955), American scientist
Adrienne Ames (1907–1947), American film actress
Aldrich Ames (born 1941), American convicted spy for the Soviet Union
Alfred Elisha Ames, American physician and politician
August Ames (1994–2017), Canadian pornographic actress
Azel Ames (1845–1908), American physician, author, and public health authority
Blanche Ames Ames (1878–1969), American artist, inventor, writer, and prominent supporter of women's suffrage and birth control
Blanche Butler Ames (1847–1939), the wife of Gen. Adelbert Ames
Bruce Ames (born 1928), American biochemist
Cheney Ames (1808–1892), New York politician
David Ames (disambiguation), several people
DeHart H. Ames (1872–1955), New York politician
Ed Ames (born 1927), American popular singer and actor
Eleanor Maria Easterbrook Ames (1831-1908), American writer, publisher
Fisher Ames (1758–1808), Congressman from Massachusetts
Frederick Lothrop Ames (1835–1893), American railroad tycoon, grandson of Oliver Ames Sr.
Frederick Lothrop Ames Jr. (1876–1921), Massachusetts financier and socialite, great-grandson of Oliver Ames Sr.
Herman Vandenburg Ames (1865–1935), American historian
Hermes L. Ames (1865–1920), New York politician
James Ames (disambiguation), several people
John Ames (disambiguation), several people
Jonathan Ames (born 1964), American author
Joseph Ames (disambiguation), several people
Julia A. Ames (1816-1891), American journalist, editor, reformer
Leon Ames (1902–1993), American actor
Lydia May Ames (1863–1940), American painter
Les Ames (1905–1990), English cricketer
Mary C. Ames (1831–1884), American journalist, author, poet
Nathaniel Ames (1708–1764), American almanac maker
Nadine Ames (born 1991), Indonesian actresses 
Oakes Ames (1804–1873), American manufacturer and Congressman from Massachusetts
Oakes Ames (botanist) (1874–1950), American botanist
Oakes Angier Ames (1829–1899), industrialist and philanthropist from Massachusetts
Oliver Ames (disambiguation), several people
Rachel Ames (born 1929), American actress
Ramsay Ames (1919–1998), American movie actress
Red Ames (1882–1936), Major League Baseball pitcher
Roger Ames (born 1942), American Anglican priest
Roger T. Ames, Canadian sinologist, linguist, and translator of a version of the Analects of Confucius and the Zhongyong
Rosemary Ames (1906–1988), American film actress 
Samuel Ames (1824–1875), New York politician
Samuel Ames (jurist), Chief Justice of Rhode Island 1856–1866
Solace Ames, American writer
Stephen Ames (born 1964), golfer from Trinidad and Tobago and Canada
William Ames (1576-1633), English theologian
William Ames (Quaker) (died 1662), English preacher
Winthrop Ames (1870–1937), American producer and playwright; son of Oakes Angier Ames
The Ames Brothers, 20th-century American singing quartet

References